Muhtarophis barani, also known commonly as the Amanos dwarf snake and Baran's black-headed dwarf snake, is a species of snake in the monotypic genus Muhtarophis in the subfamily Colubrinae of the family Colubridae. The species is endemic to the Amanos Mountains of Turkey, and was discovered in 2007.

Etymology
The generic name, Muhtarophis, is in honor of Turkish herpetologist Muhtar Başoğlu (with the suffix -ophis meaning "snake").

The specific name, barani, is in honor of Turkish herpetologist  of the Dokuz Eylül University, İzmir.

Habitat

Description
M. barani has 17 dorsal scale rows at midbody, and 163–173 ventral scales. The head is oblique-shaped anteriorly. There is a distinctive black blotch under the eye, running into a narrow stripe. The dorsal surface of the body is colored reddish brown, with no spots.

Reproduction
M. barani is oviparous.

References

Further reading
Avci A, Ilgaz Ç, Rajabizadeh M, Yilmaz C, Üzüm N, Andriaens D, Kumlutaş Y, Olgun K (2015). "Molecular phylogeny and micro CT-scanning revealed extreme cryptic biodiversity in kukri snake Muhtarophis gen. nov.,  a new genus for Rhynchocalamus barani (Serpentes: Colubridae)". Russian Journal of Herpetology 22 (3): 159–174.
Olgun K, Avci A, Ilgaz Ç, Üzüm N, Yilmaz C (2007). "A new species of Rhynchocalamus (Reptilia: Serpentes: Colubridae) from Turkey". Zootaxa 1399: 57–68. (Rhynchocalamus barani, new species).

Colubrids
Reptiles described in 2007